Ruhooglandia is a monotypic genus of flowering plants belonging to the family Poaceae. It only contains one knowns species, Ruhooglandia hooglandii (Holttum) S.Dransf. & K.M.Wong 

It is native to New Guinea.

It is named after the Dutch botanist Ruurd Dirk Hoogland (1922-1994).

References

Bambusoideae
Bambusoideae genera
Flora of New Guinea